Fluxton is a hamlet situated in the Otter Valley, East Devon. It is made up predominantly of old farmhouses and new barn conversions and has a population of approximately 99.

Fluxton Football Club
Fluxton Football Club was founded in 2012 by brothers Alex and Oliver Paget. FFC play their home games at Tipton St John in the Devon and Exeter Football League. The club won its first match 5–1 against the Tipton St John Reserves.

Fluxton FC were promoted in their first season from Division 7 to 6 after finishing 2nd in the league and were promoted again the following year and will start the 2014/15 season in Division 5.

Fluxton FC are known for their fluidic passing and high pressing game which gave them success last season as their 3-5-2 formation adopted by player manager Chris Sercombe forced a late surge to promotion. Fluxton FC are also renowned for their fair play attitude towards the game which they received great credit for in their first two seasons, a true testament to the founding Paget brothers who emphasise this Fluxton Philosophy.

Fluxton FC were crowned Devon and Exeter Football League 2014/15 Division 5 Champions on Saturday 25 April after beating Sandford FC 0–6 away taking the title by one point from Honiton Town 2nd who finished their season prior to the final weekend. In a club statement, the Fluxton official said a big thanks to all the fans, players and everyone involved at the club as the champagne was sprayed in the background. "Fluxton are only one of a few teams that since their creation in 2012 have had promotion after promotion and this league title is only fitting to the Fluxton way".

Honours 
Devon & Exeter League Division 7 - Runners Up 2012/13
Devon & Exeter League Division 6 - 8th place Promotion 2013/14
Devon & Exeter League Division 5 - Winners 2014/15

Players 
GK Matt Sercombe
DF Lee Chapman
DF Chris Sercombe
DF Tristan Long
DF John Ashley
DF Andrew Butcher
DF Rob Ashman
DF Theo Burgess
DF/MF Andi Davies
MF Alex Paget 
MF Graham Hughes
MF Simon Durrant
MF Olly Paget
MF Rob Hart
MF James Godfrey
MF Rich Rapps
FW Matt Clothier-Smith
FW Nathan Devereux
FW Tom Rapps
ST Hayden Figures
ST James Santer

References

Hamlets in Devon